Eunos Crescent Football Club is a Singaporean association football club based in Eunos, Singapore, that competes in the Singapore National Football League.

History
The club was established in 1975. In 2006 they won Division Two of the National Football League, and were promoted to Division One. In 2016 they won Division One.

In 2017, the club agreed a partnership with Dutch club VVV-Venlo, adopting training methods used by Venlo and sending youth players to train in the Netherlands.

Singapore Internationals
Although the club is playing in Singapore Football League which is below Singapore Premier League, several former Singapore internationals and S.League players are playing for it such as Goh Swee Swee, Tengku Mushadad, Indra Sahdan and Ahmad Latiff with more than 150 caps within them.

Honours
National Football League
Division 1 Champions: 2016
Division 2 Champions: 2006

References

Amateur champs Eunos Crescent eye place among S.League big boys
Cairnhjll beat South Avenue

Football clubs in Singapore
1975 establishments in Singapore
Association football clubs established in 1975